James D. Wilson is an American politician who served as the Colorado State Representative for the 60th district from January 9, 2013 to January 13, 2021. He is a member of the Republican Party.

Education
Wilson earned his BA in history, physical education, and social studies from Southwestern College.

Elections
2012 When Republican Representative Tom Massey retired and left the District 60 seat open, Wilson won the June 26, 2012 Republican Primary with 4,255 votes (57.2%); and won the four-way November 6, 2012 General election with 22,457 votes (55.9%) against Democratic nominee Pier Cohen, Libertarian candidate M. Bruce Waters, and Independent candidate Curtis Imrie, who had run for the seat in 2006.

References

External links
Official page at the Colorado General Assembly
Campaign site
 

Year of birth missing (living people)
Living people
Republican Party members of the Colorado House of Representatives
People from Kiowa, Kansas
People from Salida, Colorado
Southwestern College (Kansas) alumni
21st-century American politicians